St Stephen's School is a K-12, co-educational independent, day school of the Uniting Church located on two campuses – one in Duncraig and the other in Carramar, two suburbs of Perth, Western Australia.  The school is one of Western Australia's largest independent schools. The Duncraig campus opened in 1983  for Year 3 to Year 12 and the Carramar campus in Tapping opened in 2001 for Kindergarten to Year 12. In 2011 the school opened the new Early Learning Centre (ELC) in Hepburn Heights (across the road from the Duncraig campus) for Kindergarten to Year 2, introducing a Pre-Kindergarten, that takes place on Wednesdays, in the mid 2010s.

The school also owns a 115-acre property, the Nanga Outdoor Education Facility, consisting of bushland, field, forest and 800 metres of Murray River frontage. The property is used for school camps and retreats, leadership development and team building activities.

History 

 1983 – Foundation of the Duncraig campus
 1993 – Opening of the primary school at Duncraig
 2000 – Completion of the Performing Arts Centre and new administration complex
 2001 – The school opened a second campus in Carramar.
 2007 – Construction begins on new technology and enterprise building at Duncraig
 2008 – 25th anniversary of Duncraig & Carrmar campus
 2008 – Opening of new Carramar gym, named the Sports & Learning Centre
 2009 – Opening of new technology and enterprise building at Duncraig, named the Lorraine Paul Centre and the renaming of the Design and Technology building to the Glenda Parkin Learning Centre.
 2010 – The 10th anniversary of the Carramar campus
 2011 – Opening of Early Learning Centre, Hepburn Heights
 2012 – Construction begins on extensive renovations and extensions of the Collinson Library at Duncraig
 2013 – Re-opening of the renovated Collinson Library at Duncraig
 2013 – The 30th anniversary of St Stephen's School
 2016 – Renovation of Duncraig Primary library
 2018 – Renovation of houses at Duncraig campus
 2019 – The 35th anniversary of St Stephens's School
 2021 – New educational suites unveiled, Duncraig Primary
 2021 – Announcement of Duncraig Secondary science suite renovation

Houses (Factions) 

St Stephen's School's "House" structure is used to decide student homerooms, sporting events, or other similar matters. Houses are randomly assigned to students upon arrival at the school, however students with parents, or other immediate family members who attend(ed) the school will be assigned to the same house as their family members.

Duncraig Houses 
 Alethea (Red House) - Meaning: Truth - Mascot: Phoenix
 Carana (Yellow House) - Meaning: Joy - Mascot: Tiger
 Timae (Blue House) - Meaning: Honour - Mascot: Octopus

Carramar Houses 
 Charis (Maroon House) - Meaning: Grace - Mascot: Kangaroo
 Makaria (Green House) - Meaning: Happiness - Mascot: Dragon
 Parresia (Blue House) - Meaning: Boldness - Mascot: Polar Bear

Staff History

Principal
 1983–1988:   John Allen Williams
 1989–2003:   Gavin Collinson
 2003–2007:   Glenda Parkin
 2007–2008:   Desmond Mitchell
 2009–2010:   Caryl Roberts
 2011–2016:   Tony George
 2017–Present:    Donella Beare

Notable alumni
 Alex Loughton – Basketball Player
 Daniel Parker – AFL Player
 Shane Parker – AFL Player
 Alex Williams – Actor
 Daniel Stynes – Footballer
Ben Popham - Paralympic Swimmer
Crockett Groves - Actor

References

External links 
 St Stephen's School Website

Private primary schools in Perth, Western Australia
Junior School Heads Association of Australia Member Schools in Western Australia
Educational institutions established in 1982
Private secondary schools in Perth, Western Australia
1982 establishments in Australia
Uniting Church schools in Australia